Nikolay Davydenko defeated Rafael Nadal in the final, 6–4, 6–2 to win the men's singles tennis title at the 2008 Miami Open. It was his second Masters title.

Novak Djokovic was the defending champion, but lost in the second round to qualifier Kevin Anderson.

Seeds
All seeds received a bye into the second round.

Draw

Finals

Top half

Section 1

Section 2

Section 3

Section 4

Bottom half

Section 5

Section 6

Section 7

Section 8

Qualifying

Qualifying seeds

Qualifiers

Lucky loser
  Guillermo García López

Qualifying draws

First qualifier

Second qualifier

Third qualifier

Fourth qualifier

Fifth qualifier

Sixth qualifier

Seventh qualifier

Eighth qualifier

Ninth qualifier

Tenth qualifier

Eleventh qualifier

Twelfth qualifier

References

External links
Draw
Qualifying Draw

Sony Ericsson Open - Mens Singles, 2008
2008 Sony Ericsson Open